The  ("National hymn"), WAB 94, is a patriotic song composed by Anton Bruckner in 1882 for a competition for a  (Hymn for the German People in Austria).

History 

On 16 October 1881, the Deutsche Zeitung invited submissions for a text  (for a singable national hymn). From 1,750 texts entered, Josef Winter's was awarded the first prize. Bruckner, as one of the 1,320 participants, sent a sample of both settings. No prize was awarded for any of the submissions.

The manuscripts are stored in the archive of the Österreichische Nationalbibliothek and the Bibliothèque nationale de Paris. The two settings were first published in Band III/2, pp. 191 and 192 of the Göllerich/Auer biography.

Lyrics
The song uses Josef Winter's lyrics:

Music 
There are two settings of the Volkslied WAB 94:
 A 34-bar-long setting for voice and piano, which uses the first strophe of Winter's text. 
 A 67-bar-long setting for men's  choir, which uses the six strophes of Winter's text.

Discography

Setting for voice and piano 
There is no commercial recording of this setting. A live performance by Raymond Armstrong (1 April 2017) is stored in the Bruckner Archive.

Setting for men's choir 
There is a single recording of this setting:
Thomas Kerbl, Männerchorvereinigung, Weltliche Männerchöre – CD: LIVA 054, 2012 – 1st strophe only
Note The Volkslied has been performed at the Brucknerfest 2022 (Brucknerfest 2022 - Krieg und Frieden (29-09-2022)). A recording is available in the Bruckner Archive.

References

Sources 
 August Göllerich, Anton Bruckner. Ein Lebens- und Schaffens-Bild,  – posthumous edited by Max Auer by G. Bosse, Regensburg, 1932
 Anton Bruckner – Sämtliche Werke, Band XXIII/1: Lieder für Gesang und Klavier (1851–1882), Musikwissenschaftlicher Verlag der Internationalen Bruckner-Gesellschaft, Angela Pachovsky (Editor), Vienna, 1997
 Anton Bruckner – Sämtliche Werke, Band XXIII/2:  Weltliche Chorwerke (1843–1893), Musikwissenschaftlicher Verlag der Internationalen Bruckner-Gesellschaft, Angela Pachovsky and Anton Reinthaler (Editor), Vienna, 1989
 Cornelis van Zwol, Anton Bruckner 1824–1896 – Leven en werken, uitg. Thoth, Bussum, Netherlands, 2012. 
 Uwe Harten, Anton Bruckner. Ein Handbuch. Residenz Verlag, Salzburg, 1996. .

External links 
 
 Volkslied C-Dur, WAB 94 – Critical discography by Hans Roelofs 

Weltliche Chorwerke by Anton Bruckner
Lieder by Anton Bruckner
1882 compositions
German patriotic songs
Compositions in C major